Bioclogging or biological clogging is the clogging of pore space in soil by microbial biomass; their body and their byproducts such as  extracellular polymeric substance (EPS). The microbial biomass blocks the pathway of water in the pore space, forming a certain thickness of the impermeable layer in the soil, and it reduces the rate of infiltration of water remarkably.

Bioclogging is observed under continuous ponded infiltration at various field conditions such as artificial recharge ponds, percolation trenches, irrigation channels, sewage treatment systems, constructed wetlands, and landfill liners. It also affects groundwater flow in the aquifer, such as ground source heat pumps, permeable reactive barriers, and microbial enhanced oil recovery. In the situation where infiltration of water at an appropriate rate is needed, bioclogging can be problematic and countermeasures such as regular drying of the system are taken. In some cases, bioclogging can be utilized to make an impermeable layer to minimize the rate of infiltration.

General description

Change in permeability with time
Bioclogging is observed as the decrease in the infiltration rate. A decrease in the infiltration rate under ponded infiltration was observed in the 1940s for studying the infiltration of artificial recharge ponds and the water-spreading on agricultural soils. When soils are continuously submerged, permeability or saturated hydraulic conductivity changes in 3 stages which was explained as follows.
 Permeability decreases for 10 to 20 days possibly due to physical changes in the structure of the soil.
 Permeability increases due to dissolving the entrapped air in soil into the percolating water.
 Permeability decreases for 2 to 4 weeks due to the disintegration of aggregates and biological clogging of soil pores with microbial cells and their synthesized products, slimes, or polysaccharides.

The 3 stages are not necessarily distinct in every field condition of bioclogging; when the second stage is not clear, permeability just continues to decrease.

Various types of clogging
The change in permeability with time is observed in various field situations. Depending on the field condition, there are various causes for the change in the hydraulic conductivity, summarized as follows.

 Physical causes: Physical clogging by suspended solids or physical changes of soils such as the disintegration of aggregate structure. Dissolving of the entrapped air in soil into the percolating water is a physical cause for the increase in hydraulic conductivity.
 Chemical causes: Change in the electrolyte concentration or the sodium adsorption ratio in the aqueous phase, which causes dispersion and swelling of clay particles.
 Biological causes: Usually bioclogging means the first of the following, while bioclogging in a broader sense means all of the following.
 Bioclogging by microbial cell bodies (such as bacteria, algae and fungus) and their synthesized byproducts such as extracellular polymeric substance (EPS) (also referred to as slime), which form biofilm or microcolony aggregation on soil particles are direct biological causes of the decrease in hydraulic conductivity.
 Entrapment of gas bubbles such as methane produced by methane-producing microorganisms clog the soil pore and contributes to decreasing hydraulic conductivity. As gas is also microbial byproduct, it can also be considered to be bioclogging.
 Iron bacteria stimulate ferric oxyhydroxide deposition which may cause clogging of soil pores. This is an indirect biological cause of the decrease in hydraulic conductivity.

Bioclogging is mostly observed in saturated conditions, but bioclogging in the unsaturated conditions is also studied.

Field observation

Under ponded infiltration

Field problem and countermeasure
Bioclogging is observed under continuous ponded infiltration in such places as artificial recharge ponds, and percolation trenches. Reduction of infiltration rate due to bioclogging at the infiltrating surface reduces the efficiency of such systems. To minimize the bioclogging effects, pretreatment of the water to reduce suspended solids, nutrients, and organic carbon might be necessary. Regular drying of the system and physical removal of the clogging layer can also be effective countermeasures. Even if operated cautiously in this way, bioclogging is still likely to occur because of microbiological growth at the infiltrating surface.

Septic drain fields are also susceptible to bioclogging because nutrient-rich wastewater flows continuously. The bioclogging material in the septic tank is sometimes called biomat. Pretreatment of water by filtration or reducing the load of the system could delay the failure of the system by bioclogging. Slow sand filter system also suffers from bioclogging. Besides the countermeasures mentioned above, cleaning or backwashing sand may be operated to remove biofilm and recover the permeability of sand.

Bioclogging in rivers can impact aquifer recharge, especially in dry regions where losing rivers are common.

Benefit
Bioclogging can have a positive effect in certain cases. For example, in the dairy waste stabilization ponds used for the treatment of dairy farm wastewater, bioclogging effectively seals up the bottom of the pond. Algae and bacteria may be inoculated to promote bioclogging in irrigation channels for seepage control.

Bioclogging is also beneficial in landfill liners such as compacted clay liners. Clay liners are usually applied in landfill to minimize the pollution by landfill leachate to the surrounding soil environment. The hydraulic conductivity of clay liners become lower than the original value because of bioclogging caused by microorganism in the leachate and pore spaces in clay. Bioclogging is now being studied to be applied to geotechnical engineering.

Horizontal flow
Biologging is observed in constructed wetlands for treating various types of contaminated water. When the vertical flow is applied, it is similar to the previous section. In the constructed wetland with the horizontal flow at the subsurface, preferential flow paths avoiding the clogged part can be observed.

In aquifer

Water withdrawal from the well
Bioclogging can be observed when water is withdrawn from the aquifer (below the groundwater table) through a water well. Over months and years of continued operation of water wells, they may show a gradual reduction in performance due to bioclogging or other clogging mechanisms. Bioclogging may also affect the sustainable operation of ground source heat pumps.

Bioremediation
Biofilm formation is useful in the bioremediation of biologically degradable groundwater pollution. A permeable reactive barrier is formed to contain the groundwater flow by bioclogging and also to degrade pollution by microbes. Contaminant flow should be carefully analyzed because a preferential flow path in the barrier may reduce the efficiency of the remediation.

Oil recovery
In the extraction of petroleum, a technique of enhanced oil recovery is implemented to increase the amount of oil to be extracted from an oil field. The injected water displaces the oil in the reservoir which is transported to recovery wells. As the reservoir is not uniform in permeability, injected water tends to go through a high permeable zone, and does not go through the zone where oil remains. In this situation, the bacterial profile modification technique, which injects bacteria into the high permeable zone to promote bioclogging can be employed. It is a type of microbial enhanced oil recovery.

See also
 Biofilm
 Hydraulic conductivity
 Landfill liner
 Microbial enhanced oil recovery
 Septic tank
 Slow sand filter

References

Soil
Environmental soil science
Soil physics
Microbiology